Johnny is an album by American pop singer Johnny Mathis that was released on July 15, 1963, by Columbia Records and later described on Allmusic as "a nice blend of standards, show tunes and then-new compositions."

The LP debuted on Billboard magazine's album chart in the issue dated August 24, 1963, and remained there for 27 weeks, during which time it got as high as number 20. One song from the album, "No Man Can Stand Alone", had been released on May 7 of that year as the B-side of "Every Step of the Way".

This album was "remixed and mastered from the original session tapes in 20-bit Super Bit Mapping" for its first release on compact disc on May 7, 1996.

Reception
Cub Koda of Allmusic described this Mathis outing as "one of his best… with Costa's arrangements fitting like a glove around Mathis's pipes." He also mentions some standout performances. "Everything on here works just fine, but pay special attention to 'The Most Beautiful Girl in the World', 'I Can't Believe That You're in Love with Me', Cole Porter's 'I Love You', and Duke Ellington's 'Jump for Joy'." The reviewer concludes, "No big hits on here, maybe, but a more solid track-by-track Johnny Mathis album you'd be hard pressed to find."

Upon its release, the review in Billboard was more focused upon his switch from Columbia to Mercury Records. "Mathis has departed the label, but his memory (in terms of sales and dollars and cents) is likely to linger on with this latest grouping, done up to Don Costa's slick arrangements."

Track listing

Side one
"Easy Does It" (Kenny Jacobson, Rhoda Roberts) – 2:08
"The Most Beautiful Girl in the World" from Jumbo (Lorenz Hart, Richard Rodgers) – 3:45
"Miracles" (Bart Howard) – 2:51
"(Ah, the Apple Trees) When the World Was Young" (M. Phillippe-Gérard, Johnny Mercer) – 3:47
"Never Never Land" from Peter Pan (Betty Comden, Adolph Green, Jule Styne) – 4:01
"Poor Butterfly" from the musical The Big Show (John Golden, Raymond Hubbell) – 4:15

Side two
"Jump for Joy" (Duke Ellington, Sid Kuller, Paul Francis Webster) – 2:15
"Joey, Joey, Joey" from The Most Happy Fella (Frank Loesser) – 3:56
"I Can't Believe That You're in Love with Me" (Clarence Gaskill, Jimmy McHugh) – 3:00
"I Love You" from Mexican Hayride (Cole Porter) – 3:27
"Weaver of Dreams" (Jack Elliott, Victor Young) – 3:13
"No Man Can Stand Alone" (Jack Segal, Paul Vance) – 2:35

Recording dates
From the liner notes for The Voice of Romance: The Columbia Original Album Collection:
January 3, 1963 – "I Can't Believe That You're in Love With Me", "I Love You", "Miracles", "Poor Butterfly"
January 7, 1963 – "(Ah, the Apple Trees) When the World Was Young", "Joey, Joey, Joey", "The Most Beautiful Girl in the World", "No Man Can Stand Alone", "Weaver of Dreams"
January 8, 1963 – "Easy Does It", "Jump for Joy", "Never Never Land"

Personnel

Original album
Johnny Mathis – vocals
Ernie Altschuler – producer
Don Costa – arranger and conductor
Ted Brosman – recording engineer
Frank Laico – recording engineer
Robert Waller – recording engineer
Ralph Cowan – cover painting

1996 CD reissue
Didier C. Deutsch – producer; liner notes
Thomas Ruff – remixing, mastering
Adam Block – project director
Joy Gilbert – product manager
Lisa Sparagano – design
Hope Chasin – packaging manager
Sony Music Photo Library – photos
Remixed and mastered at Sony Music Studios, New York

References

Bibliography

1963 albums
Johnny Mathis albums
Columbia Records albums
Albums conducted by Don Costa
Albums arranged by Don Costa
Albums recorded at CBS 30th Street Studio